The Jeevan Raksha Padak is a civilian lifesaving award presented by the Government of India. Established on 30 September 1961, the award was originally called the Jeevan Raksha Padak, Class III.

Criteria
The Jeevan Raksha Padak is awarded to civilians to reward saving lives from drowning, fire, or mine accidents. It is awarded for "courage and promptitude in 
saving life under circumstances of grave bodily injury to the rescuer".

The Jeevan Raksha Padak may be awarded to members of the armed forces, police, or fire services when recognizable acts take place outside beyond the course of their duty. Subsequent awards are recognized by the addition of a medal bar to the ribbon. The medal may be awarded posthumously.

References

External links
 Recipient of 2003
 Recipient of 2014
 Recipient of 2016
 Recipient of 2021

Civil awards and decorations of India
Courage awards